Kuniaki (written: , ,  or ) is a masculine Japanese given name. Notable people with the name include:

, Japanese diplomat
, Japanese musician and composer
, Japanese professional wrestler
, Japanese general and Prime Minister of Japan
, Japanese boxer
, Japanese drifting driver

Japanese masculine given names